Bishop Creek is a stream in the U.S. state of Oregon. It is a tributary to Forest Creek.

Bishop Creek was named after James Bishop, a pioneer citizen.

References

Rivers of Oregon
Rivers of Jackson County, Oregon